The Science and Technology Committee is a select committee of the House of Lords in the Parliament of the United Kingdom. It has a broad remit "to consider science and technology".

Membership
As of January 2023, the membership of the committee is as follows:

See also
List of Committees of the United Kingdom Parliament
Science and Technology Committee (House of Commons)

External links
 Science and Technology Select Committee, UK Parliament
 The records of the House of Lords Science and Technology Committee are held by the UK Parliamentary Archives

Committees of the House of Lords
Politics of science
Science and technology in the United Kingdom